Pilipectus prunifera is a moth of the family Noctuidae first described by George Hampson in 1894. It is found in Sri Lanka, China, Taiwan and Japan.

References

Moths of Asia
Moths described in 1894